Netechma cajanumae is a species of moth of the family Tortricidae. It is found in Loja Province, Ecuador.

The wingspan is 16 mm. The ground colour of the forewings is whitish with pale yellowish-brown suffusions and browner dots. The hindwings are whitish cream, slightly tinged with brownish at the apex and pale brownish strigulation (fine streaks).

References

Moths described in 2008
Netechma
Moths of South America
Taxa named by Józef Razowski